Xyroptila variegata is a moth of the family Pterophoridae. It is found on the eastern Papuan Islands (Goodenough Island and d'Entrecasteaux).

References

External links

Moths described in 2006
Endemic fauna of Papua New Guinea
variegata